Cherokee is a city in Cherokee County, Iowa, United States. The population was 5,199 at the 2020 Census, down from 5,369 in 2000. It is the county seat of Cherokee County.

History
Cherokee was laid out as a town in 1870, and was named for the Southeast Indian tribe, most of whose members had been removed to Indian Territory in the late 1830s. Cherokee was incorporated on April 5, 1873.

Geography

Climate

Demographics

2010 census
At the 2010 census there were 5,253 people in 2,316 households, including 1,339 families, in the city. The racial makeup of the city was 95.5% White, 1.0% African American, 0.3% Native American, 0.7% Asian, 0.2% Pacific Islander, 1.2% from other races, and 1.1% from two or more races. Hispanic or Latino of any race were 2.9%.

Of the 2,316 households 24.6% had children under the age of 18 living with them, 43.9% were married couples living together, 9.6% had a female householder with no husband present, 4.3% had a male householder with no wife present, and 42.2% were non-families. 37.3% of households were one person and 16.9% were one person aged 65 or older. The average household size was 2.14 and the average family size was 2.77.

The median age was 46.3 years. 20.2% of residents were under the age of 18; 7.1% were between the ages of 18 and 24; 21.1% were from 25 to 44; 28.9% were from 45 to 64; and 22.8% were 65 or older. The gender makeup of the city was 48.6% male and 51.4% female.

2000 census
At the 2000 census there were 5,369 people in 2,362 households, including 1,393 families, in the city. The racial makeup of the city was 97.5% White, 0.54% African American, 0.22% Native American, 0.61% Asian, 0.54% from other races, and 0.58% from two or more races. Hispanic or Latino of any race were 1.51%.

Of the 2,362 households 25.9% had children under the age of 18 living with them, 47.3% were married couples living together, 8.6% had a female householder with no husband present, and 41.0% were non-families. 37.3% of households were one person and 19.0% were one person aged 65 or older. The average household size was 2.16 and the average family size was 2.82.

Age spread: 23.2% under the age of 18, 7.2% from 18 to 24, 22.9% from 25 to 44, 24.9% from 45 to 64, and 21.9% 65 or older. The median age was 43 years. For every 100 females, there were 92.3 males. For every 100 females age 18 and over, there were 85.4 males.

The median household income was $31,240 and the median family income  was $42,333. Males had a median income of $28,350 versus $21,333 for females. The per capita income for the city was $17,846. About 5.0% of families and 7.0% of the population were below the poverty line, including 10.5% of those under age 18 and 4.5% of those age 65 or over.

Arts and culture

Sites on the National Register of Historic Places 
The nearby Cherokee Sewer Site is a well-preserved prehistoric Indian bison-processing site. Findings here have helped to redefine the Archaic period in the Midwest. The Phipps Site is a 1000-year-old indigenous Plains farming village, which may have been fortified. It is designated as a National Historic Landmark.

Annual events
The annual Jazz Festival is held in January, often headlined by Mark Pender, a member of the Basic Cable  band.

The Cherokee County Fair, and the Cherokee Rodeo are held in the summer.

Creek Fest is an annual summer music festival held along the banks of Mill Creek.  Past performers include Kid Rock, The Band Perry, Big & Rich, and Florida Georgia Line.

Museums
Cherokee is the home of the Sanford Museum and Planetarium that opened in 1951. The founders, Mr & Mrs W.A. Sanford, intended to create a museum that was free and open to the public. The facility  still operated free to the public and has exhibits and activities on a variety of subjects including: archaeology, art, astronomy, geology, history, natural history, and paleontology.

Cherokee may be the smallest town in the world to have its own symphony orchestra, the Cherokee Symphony. This 60-member orchestra has been referred to as "the best kept secret in Northwest Iowa".

Education
The Cherokee Community School District operates local schools.

Infrastructure

Health care
Cherokee is the home of Cherokee Regional Medical Center.

Cherokee is also the home of the Cherokee Mental Health Institute, under the Iowa Department of Human Services.

Notable people  

 Ralph Block, film producer and screenwriter; president of Screen Actors Guild.
 Elwood Brown, basketball coach.
 Wilmer D. Elfrink, football and basketball player.
 Guy M. Gillette, U.S. Representative (1930 - 1936) and Senator (1936 -1945) from Iowa.
 Roger Goeb, composer.
 Kelly Goodburn, NFL punter and Super Bowl champion for Washington Redskins.
 Major General Joseph A. Green, Chief of the Coast Artillery Corps.
 T. J. Hockenson, tight end for the Minnesota Vikings.
 Dan Huseman, member of Iowa House of Representatives.
 Royal C. Johnson, 8th Attorney General of South Dakota, U.S. Representative from South Dakota; highly decorated World War I veteran.
 Matt Koch, MLB baseball player with Arizona Diamondbacks.
 Ben F. Laposky, artist and mathematician.
 Edward Lindberg, Olympic gold medalist in 1912, track and field.
 Steve Melter, baseball player.
 Thomas Miller, Iowa newspaper editor and politician
 Spike Nelson, football player and coach.
 Ken Nordine, voiceover.
 Doug Ohlson, abstract artist.
 Jason Ravnsborg, 31st Attorney General of South Dakota.
 Laurence Rickels, theorist and philosopher, studied vampires, the Devil, technology and science fiction.
 General John D. Ryan, US Air Force Chief of Staff, 1969–71.
 Francis L. Sampson, Army officer whose rescue of young soldier inspired film Saving Private Ryan.
 Harold D. Schuster, editor and film director.
 Adam Timmerman, NFL lineman and Super Bowl champion for St. Louis Rams and Green Bay Packers.
 Steven VanRoekel, second Federal Chief Information Officer of the United States
 Stanton Warburton, U.S. Representative from Washington; moved to Cherokee.

Notes

References

External links 
 

City of Cherokee, Iowa Website Portal style website, Government, Business, Library, Recreation and more

 
Cities in Cherokee County, Iowa
Cities in Iowa
County seats in Iowa
Populated places established in 1873
1873 establishments in Iowa